Centennial High School is a four-year public  secondary school in Boise, Idaho. Although located in Boise, it is part of the West Ada School District; at the time of its construction, CHS was in unincorporated Ada County. The West Ada district's second of five traditional high schools, Centennial opened in 1987 and serves neighborhoods in northwestern Boise and northeastern Meridian. The centennial of Idaho statehood was observed in 1990.

The school colors of Centennial are maroon and silver, and its mascot is a patriot.

Demographics
The demographic breakdown of the 1,701 students enrolled in 2013-14 was:
Male - 50.9%
Female - 49.1%
Native American/Alaskan - 0.5%
Asian/Pacific islanders - 4.0%
Black - 2.7%
Hispanic - 9.6%
White - 80.0%
Multiracial - 3.2%

31.1% of the students were eligible for free or reduced lunch.

Athletics and activities
Among the largest schools in the state, it competes in athletics and activities in IHSAA Class 5A in the Southern Idaho Conference (5A) (SIC).

State titles
Boys
 Football (4): fall 1988, 1996, 1999, 2003 
 Cross Country (5): fall 1991, 1992, 1993, 1994, 1999 
 Soccer (4): fall 2000, 2004, 2005, 2006, 2009  (introduced in 2000)
 Basketball (2): 1995, 2003 
 Wrestling (3): 1989, 2007, 2013 

 Track (6): 1988, 1989, 1990, 1991, 1992, 1999 
 Golf (1): 1994 
 Hockey (2): 2012, 2013
 Tennis - (combined until 2008, see below)

Girls

 Cross Country (3): fall 1991, 1993, 1994  
 Soccer (2): fall 2014, 2015 (introduced in 2000)
 Volleyball (2): fall 1993, 2001 
 Basketball (5): 1993, 1996, 1998, 2004, 2006 
 Softball (1): 1997 (introduced in 1997)
 Golf (4): 1990, 1991, 1992, 1993 
 Tennis (1): 2008  (combined team until 2008)

Combined
 Tennis (7): 1991, 1994, 1995, 1996, 1997, 1998, 1999  (combined until 2008)
 Debate (1): 2013
 Drama (8): 2002, 2003, 2004, 2005, 2006, 2007, 2008, 2009

Notable alumni
Rick Bauer, Former professional baseball player (Baltimore Orioles, Texas Rangers, Cleveland Indians)
Sofia Huerta, soccer; Mexico women's national football team and US women's national soccer team
Aaron Paul,  actor (best known as Jesse Pinkman on the AMC series Breaking Bad)
Logan Emory, soccer - MLS - Los Angeles Galaxy
Brock Forsey, football - National Football League (NFL) - (Chicago Bears, Miami Dolphins, Washington Redskins)

Charles Burton class 1991 2000 Olympic Team Freestyle Wrestling 5th place

References

External links

West Ada District #2

Educational institutions established in 1987
Treasure Valley
High schools in Boise, Idaho
Schools in Ada County, Idaho
School buildings completed in 1987
Public high schools in Idaho
1987 establishments in Idaho
West Ada School District (Idaho)